Nebojsa Vukosavljevic (born 4 May 1978 in SFR Yugoslavia) is an Australian former soccer player who is last known to have played for Noble Park United.

Singapore

Moving to Geylang United of the Singaporean S.League for the 2002 season, Vukosavljevic originally struggled to find the net, mustering two goals in 11 appearances, generally performing under pressure. Suddenly, he found his form in the middle of the year, hauling 6 goals from 5 games, including a goal and an assist in a 3–0 victory over Balestier.

Personal life

After the disintegration of Yugoslavia, he got Australian citizenship.

References 

Australian expatriate soccer players
Geylang International FC players
Association football forwards
1978 births
Living people
Australian soccer players
Expatriate footballers in Singapore
Port Melbourne SC players
Australian expatriate sportspeople in Singapore